This is a list of characters in the game of Cluedo (UK) / Clue (US).

Dr. Black / Mr. Boddy 
Dr. Black (UK) / Mr. Boddy (US), a stock character and generic victim, is the owner of Tudor Close (later known as Tudor Manor, Tudor Hall, and Boddy Mansion). In Cluedo, he is the unseen host who is murdered, which inspires the quest to discover who murdered him, with what weapon, and what room in his mansion the crime occurred. Dr. Black was listed in the original patent filing as one of the 10 characters created for the game, in which one character was drawn from the suspect cards to be the new victim before the start of a game. Mr. Boddy's name is a pun on the fact that the character is a dead body.

In the 2023 edition of the game, the two names are combined into the character, Boden "Boddy" Black Jr, a man who acquired his significant wealth by inheritance. At the time of his murder in the game's updated story, he has used connections to government officials in Hue County, the game's setting, to push through permitting and construction on Boden Black Hotel, a luxury hotel which the public opposes.

In the film, Mr. Boddy is primarily portrayed by Lee Ving while Tim Curry portrays him in one of the film's three endings. He blackmailed the six guests of Hill House and his butler Wadsworth's wife until he is murdered. In Endings A and B, he was murdered by his maid Yvette on Miss Scarlet's orders and Mrs. Peacock respectively. In Ending C, Boddy is seemingly murdered by Professor Plum, but Wadsworth reveals himself as the real Mr. Boddy while the person Plum killed was his butler. Boddy plans to continue blackmailing the guests before he is shot by Mr. Green.

Suspects
The following are the known suspects in the Cluedo / Clue franchise:

Original suspects

These are the original suspects from the board game in rolling order:

Miss Scarlett
Miss Scarlett is a stereotypical femme fatale, typically portrayed as young, cunning, and attractive. Known as "Miss Scarlet" in North America between 1963 and 2016, she rolls first in the game.

In Clue Master Detective, Miss Scarlet is depicted as an Asian woman nicknamed the "Mercenary of Macao."

In the film, she is portrayed by Lesley Ann Warren and is depicted as a sassy Washington DC madame who runs an underground brothel. In Ending A, she orders Mr. Boddy's maid Yvette to murder her employer and the cook before murdering her in turn, along with a cop she was bribing and a passing motorist and singing telegram girl. Scarlet is eventually exposed, subdued, and arrested. In Ending C, she only murders the cop before being exposed and arrested.

In the 1990s ITV game show Cluedo, Vivienne Scarlet is the stepdaughter of Mrs. Peacock.

In the 1996 musical, Miss Scarlet used to work as a lounge singer in Las Vegas.

In the 2023 edition, she is an African-American gossip columnist who writes under the pen name "Cyan."

Colonel Mustard
Colonel Mustard is a stock military officer who rolls second. He is usually portrayed as a dignified, dapper, and dangerous military man. Originally known as Colonel Yellow, his name was changed before the game's first edition was published.

In Clue Master Detective, his full name is Algernon Mustard and is known to sleep with a revolver under his pillow.

In the film, he is portrayed by Martin Mull and is depicted as a war profiteer who sold stolen air force radios on the black market and was later involved in a top-secret fusion bomb project. In Ending C, he kills a passing motorist after recognizing him as his driver from World War II before he is exposed and arrested.

In the 1990s ITV game show Cluedo, Colonel Mike Mustard is a ex-officer of the Special Air Service who is a regular visitor of Arlington Grange. He is in a love triangle with Mrs. Peacock and her step-daughter Miss Scarlett.

In the 2002 US edition, his name is Michael Mustard; he was an former officer of the Royal Hampshire Regiment, where he first met Sir Hugh. He is very nostalgic for his war days, and has convinced a publisher that his military exploits would make for a good read. However, he has only written one chapter of his memoirs.

In the 2016 edition, Colonel Mustard is a successful and popular officer. However, behind his medals of honor, are rumors of treason and war profiteering; rumors he has paying someone to keep quiet for far too long. He believes that Mr. Boddy is his blackmailer, and eagerly comes to Tudor Mansion in search of evidence.

Mrs. White / Chef White
Mrs. White is usually portrayed as a frazzled servant who worked as Mr. Boddy's cook, housekeeper, and nanny to Mr. Boddy's nephew John. Originally known as Nurse White before her name was changed following the first edition's publication, she rolls third in the game. Various variations have been made to the character, diverging from her working class origins.

In Clue Master Detective, her full name is Blanche White and she has been a long-time maid to Mr. Boddy. She has seen many wars go by and has an eye squint from spying in keyholes.

In the film, she is portrayed by Madeline Kahn and is depicted as the widow of a nuclear physicist whose death she is suspected of being behind. In Ending C, she kills Yvette out of jealousy upon discovering she had an affair with one of her previous husbands before being exposed and arrested.

In the 1990s ITV game show Cluedo, Mrs. Blanche White is a servant at Arlington Grange. Season one had her depicted with Mr. White as a husband before the character was dropped.

In the 1996 musical, Mrs. White is the chief domestic at Boddy Manor.

In the 2002 edition, Mrs. Blanche White is the housekeeper and cook of Tudor Mansion. She also served as the nanny of Mr. John Boddy during his youth. For all her years of dedicated service, she has little to show for it.

Although originally planned to be in the 2016 edition, Mrs. White was replaced as a suspect by a new character Dr. Orchid.

In the 2023 edition of the game, the character returned as Chef White, a younger character with short white hair and a white chef's uniform coat.

Reverend Green / Mr. Green / Mayor Green
Originally patented as "The Reverend Mr Green", he is a hypocritical Anglican priest who wavers when the subject is murder. In North America, Mr. Green has taken money-oriented roles from mobster to businessman. Parker Brothers insisted on the name change, believing that the American public would object to a parson as a murder suspect. He rolls fourth in both versions.

In Clue Master Detective, he is a mobster named Thallo Green.

In the film, Mr. Green is portrayed by Michael McKean and is depicted as a closeted homosexual who is concerned that his secret might cost him his job as a State Department employee. In Ending C, he reveals himself as a straight, undercover FBI agent who was working to expose Mr. Boddy.

In the 1990s ITV game show Cluedo, Jonathan Green is a regular visitor at Arlington Grange.

In the 1996 musical, Mr. Green is an entrepreneur.

In the 2002 edition attempted to combine the two variations of the character; Mr. John Green, as known as "Reverend Green", is a who has a reputation for fraud, money laundering, and smuggling.

In the 2016 edition, Green is a charming con-artist who is hiding, disguised as a priest.

In the 2023 edition, he is now Mayor Green, the Mayor of Hue County who sports a goatee and a green business suit.

Mrs. Peacock / Solicitor Peacock
Mrs. Peacock is a stock grande dame and an elderly yet attractive woman who nearly always maintains her dignity and rolls fifth in the game.

In Clue Master Detective, her full name is Henrietta Peacock and is depicted as an elderly ornithologist with a specialty in birds of prey. She wanted Mr. Boddy to turn his manor into a bird sanctuary as part of a donation to the Peacock Salvation Society.

In the film, she is portrayed by Eileen Brennan and is depicted as the wife of a U.S. Senator who is accused of taking bribes. In the film's second ending, or Ending B, she kills Mr. Boddy, Yvette, her former cook Mrs. Ho, who became Mr. Boddy's cook, as well as a passing motorist, cop, and singing telegram girl to prevent her secrets from being exposed as she was taking bribes from foreign powers. While the others discover her crimes, Mrs. Peacock attempts to escape, only to be arrested on her way out. In Ending C, she only kills the cook before she is exposed and arrested.

In the 1990s ITV game show Cluedo, Elizabeth Peacock resides in Arlington Grange and is the stepmother of Vivienne Scarlet.

In the 1996 musical, Mrs. Peacock is the chairwoman of Peacock Enterprises.

In the 2002 edition, Mrs. Patricia Peacock is a socialite and former actress who left England after becoming involved in a love triangle with two politicians. 

In the 2023 edition, she is now Solicitor Peacock, a younger person of color who works as an attorney.

Professor Plum
Professor Plum is the stock absent-minded professor character, who rolls last in the game.

In Clue Master Detective, his full name is Edgar Plum and is depicted as a shady archaeologist and the head of the local school's archaeology department.

In the film, he is portrayed by Christopher Lloyd and depicted as a disgraced former psychiatrist of the World Health Organization who lost his medical license for having an affair with one of his patients and became an employee at the United Nations. In Ending C, he seemingly kills Mr. Boddy, only to later learn it was actually Boddy's butler, before being exposed and arrested.

In the 1990s ITV game show Cluedo, Professor Peter Plum is a regular visitor at Arlington Grange.

In the 1996 musical, the real Professor Plum is the piano player in the orchestra while the Professor Plum in the play is a "dorky school teacher" where the culprit, location, and murder weapon are chosen by three random audience members is his accomplice.

In the 2002 edition, Professor Peter Plum is an archaeologist and Egyptologist who formerly worked as the curator in the British Museum. He was fired due to allegations of him plagiarizing his article on the dynasties of Ancient Egypt from a deceased colleague.

Additional suspects
Parker Bros. released the Clue VCR Mystery Game in 1985, which introduced the first new Cluedo characters in 36 years. The following characters also appeared in a number of spin-off games and licensed products, such as Clue Master Detective (1988):

Miss PeachMiss Peach is a Southern belle who usually manipulates others with her charm.

In the VCR Game, Melba Peach arrives by "accident" and is the daughter of M. Brunette.

In Clue Master Detective, Georgia Peach claims to be the long-lost grand-niece of Mr. Boddy.

Monsieur BrunetteMonsieur Brunette is a con artist with many talents, passports, and accents who is usually a Frenchman intent on personal gain. His name is derived from "Mr. Brown", one of the game's oldest patented but unused player names.

In the VCR Game, M. Brunette is a con artist posing as a lawyer.

In Clue Master Detective, Monsieur Alphonse Brunette is a fraudulent art dealer and arms dealer who nearly made a killing selling the missing arms of the Venus de Milo.

Madame RoseMadame Rose is a stock fortune-teller.

In the VCR Game, Madame Rose is Mr. Boddy's sister.

In Clue Master Detective, Madame Rhonda Rose is Mr. Boddy's ex-secretary of Hungarian heritage whose real name is Rhoda Rosengarten.

Sergeant Gray / Inspector GraySergeant Gray is a corrupt police sergeant. The name "Grey" was one of ten characters filed with the game's original patent. "Miss Grey" and "Mrs. Silver" are some of the oldest colour names previously unused, and "Gray" is one of the most enduring names in later editions, albeit with different characters depending on the edition.

In the VCR Game, Sergeant Gray is a crazed mental patient who escaped from the nearby asylum and evaded discovery by posing as a police officer.

In Clue Master Detective, Sergeant Gray is a no-nonsense, corrupt, unimaginative, and colorblind police officer who stumbles onto the crime scene while collecting funds for the Police Blackmail Awareness Fund.

In the mobile game, Sergeant Gray was renamed Inspector Gray who secretly worked with Dr. Black to drop tax evasion charges against the latter in exchange for a cut.

One-time suspects
In 1986, Super Cluedo Challenge and Super Sleuth were released in the UK, introducing the second wave of new board-game characters:

 Captain Brown (Super Cluedo Challenge) - Captain Robert Brown is a lower-class, drunk seaman who arrived at the mansion under mysterious circumstances.
 Mr. Slate-Grey (Super Cluedo Challenge) - A lawyer or accountant, Mr. Graham Slate-Grey is a middle-aged man in a grey suit.
 The Thief - In 1991's Cluedo: The Great Museum Caper, also known as Clue: The Great Museum Caper in North America, one player is a thief who has broken into the museum to steal paintings. Upon being spotted by a detective or the security system, they become represented by a grey pawn on the game board.

Millennial suspects
Released in 2003, Clue FX is an electronic talking version with audio voices and clues. The victim in this version is Mr. Meadow-Brook. Other new characters are:

 Lady Lavender - An herbalist who may have poisoned her husband, Lord Lawrence Lavender, Lady Lavender is an honorable woman and occasional troublemaker at times. Her Asian heritage is reminiscent of Miss Scarlet's, and she investigates Mr. Meadow-Brook's death. In Clue Mysteries, she is known as Su Sian.
 Mr. Meadow-Brook - The murder victim. Married to Jane Meadow-Brook, he was Dr. Black/Mr. Boddy's unseen solicitor. In Clue Mysteries, he is known as Miles and is an occasional theft victim.
 Mrs. Meadow-Brook - Wife of the deceased Mr. Meadow-Brook, whose murder investigation is headed by Miss Peach with the aid of Lady Lavender, Prince Azure, and Lord Grey. In Clue Mysteries, she is known as Jane. She is also a playable character in the 2006 Clue DVD game.
 Prince Azure - An "aristocratic" art and arms dealer. In Clue Mysteries, he is known as Philippe.
 Rusty Nayler - The bitter, old Tudor Mansion gardener. Rusty's name is a play on "rusty nail".
 Lord Gray - A former army cartographer who designs gardens. In Clue Mysteries, he is known as Alfred.

Parker Brothers Mystery Game suspects
Released in 2017 by Hasbro, Parker Brothers Mystery Game is a budget board game which plays with virtually identical mechanics to Clue/Cluedo, with some exceptions. While the murder victim is unnamed, the six suspects are close analogues of the original characters or their canonical replacements:

 Madame Rubie - A red-headed femme fatale dressed in red, similar to Miss Scarlett. In her bio, she is described as a cold yet elegant woman who "enjoys the finer things in life".
 General Umber - A gray-haired and bearded military man, similar to Colonel Mustard, under the rank of general. In his bio, he is described as a hero with "hard-won wisdom" who is potentially hiding a sinister secret.
 Mrs. Azul - A brunette dressed in a blue party dress and a young analogue of Mrs. Peacock. In her bio, she is described as innocent yet "a mystery in her own right".
 Mr. Pine - A man dressed in a vest and analogue of Mr. Green. Nicknamed "The Hunter" in his bio, he is described as "little more than a scoundrel" and someone who has "always gotten by on his good looks".
 Sir Ube - A dapper gentleman dressed in a purple suit and analogue of Professor Plum. In his bio, he is described as a charismatic yet shy academic who is "more comfortable in his research" than anywhere else.
 Dr. Rose - A woman dressed in a black dress and a pink top and pumps. She is a hybridization of Mrs. White and Dr. Orchid. In her bio, she is described as "the life of any party", though she is hinted as possessing "something dark behind her laughter".

The Classic Mystery Game suspects
Released in 2016, Hasbro introduced a new original character to the cast of suspects: Dr. Orchid, replacing Mrs. White. It also marks a return to the classic mansion layout and locations.

 Dr. Orchid - A PhD of East Asian heritage, she is a middle-aged woman who dresses in the color orchid (a shade of pink) and is introduced as a scientist studying plant toxicology as well as Mr. Boddy/Dr. Black's adopted daughter who was home-schooled by Mrs. White.

Other characters
In 2009, Electronic Arts released an iOS version of Clue in which the player serves as the Reporter.

 Hogarth (Super Sleuth) - The butler and a non-playable character who blocks spaces.
 The Black Dog (Super Sleuth) - An NPC dog who blocks spaces.
 Inspector Grey (Super Sleuth) - The Police Inspector and an NPC who blocks spaces.
 Editor Braunman (Cluedo iOS) - Appearing only on the menu screens, he is the editor-in-chief who sends the reporter to gather material and solve the murder case in an allotted time.
 The Reporter (Cluedo iOS) - The player character.
 Inspector Brown (Clue Mysteries) - A police inspector who tells the player if someone is lying.

Children's editions
Several variants of the game have been developed for children, most notably Clue Jr. and Cluedo Jr., which usually involve the disappearance of something or someone rather than a murder. These variants generally use the standard six surnames with different first names or titles, often changing the gender of the original character.

Typical of the first name changes, the UK edition of Cluedo Jr. introduced the first animal players or suspects: Samantha Scarlett, Mustard the Dog, Wendy White, George Green, Polly Peacock, and Peter Plum.

Cluedo Junior Detective introduced Inspector Cluedo and his bloodhound Watson, who invites his eight nieces and nephews: Jake Plum, Natalie Peacock, Jessica Scarlett, Spike Mustard, Robbie Green, Megan White, and Beth Peach; as well as investigator Tom Black.

Film
In 1985, Cluedo / Clue began expanding its character roster and served as the premise for a film of the same name:

 The Butler - Rarely used, the butler is usually the character most connected with the audience. He has appeared anonymously and as Wadsworth, Didit, Ashe, and Hogarth in related official media. In the film, Wadsworth is primarily portrayed by Tim Curry while Lee Ving portrays him in one of the film's three endings. In two of the endings, Endings A and B, he is revealed to be an undercover FBI agent. In Ending C, Wadsworth is revealed to be the true Mr. Boddy while the "Mr. Boddy" Professor Plum killed earlier was the real butler.
 The Inspector - Typically working for Scotland Yard, the inspector appears anonymously or as Pry, Brown, or Gray in related official media. In the film, the Chief of Police is portrayed by an uncredited Howard Hesseman and first appears disguised as an evangelist. In all three endings, he leads the police in raiding Hill House and arresting the murderer or murderers depending on the ending.
 Yvette - A young French maid at Hill House, portrayed by Colleen Camp. She is murdered in the billiard room with the rope by Miss Scarlett (Ending A), Mrs. Peacock (Ending B), or Mrs. White (Ending C), though she is considered a suspect beforehand. In Ending A, Wadsworth reveals Yvette was ordered by Miss Scarlett to murder Mr. Boddy and Mrs. Ho as the maid worked for Scarlett as a call girl. She also had Colonel Mustard as a client and an affair with Mrs. White's husband.
 Mrs. Ho - The cook at Hill House, portrayed by Kellye Nakahara. She is murdered in the kitchen with the dagger by Yvette on Miss Scarlett's orders (Ending A) or her former employer Mrs. Peacock (Endings B and C) early in the film.
 The Motorist - A middle-aged man who is later revealed to be Colonel Mustard's driver during World War II, portrayed by Jeffrey Kramer. He comes to Hill House after his car breaks down and is murdered in the lounge with the wrench by Miss Scarlett (Ending A), Mrs. Peacock (Ending B), or Colonel Mustard (Ending C).
 The Cop - An unnamed police officer, portrayed by Bill Henderson. He seemingly arrived at the mansion to investigate the motorist's abandoned car and make a phone call, but he is later revealed to have been invited. He is murdered in the library with the lead pipe by Miss Scarlett, whom he had been taking bribes from (Endings A and C), or Mrs. Peacock (Ending B).
 The Singing Telegram Girl''' - An unnamed singing telegram girl as well as a former patient of Professor Plum's, with whom he had an affair, portrayed by Jane Wiedlin. She arrives at Hill House to deliver a message only to be immediately shot with the revolver by Miss Scarlett (Ending A), Mrs. Peacock (Ending B), or Mr. Boddy (Ending C).

Television
In 1990, Cluedo inspired several television series which (in addition to the standard six characters) created additional characters – primarily victims. The most notable recurring character in the UK series was Mr. White, and the Australian series introduced Det. Sgt. Stanley Bogong (who also appeared in French, German and Swedish versions).

BooksClue Jr., a "Let's Read and Play" book written by Sara Miller and illustrated by Jim Talbot released in 2004, introduced five new suspects: a butler, a cook, a gardener, a maid, and a repairman.

Characters in other media
In the first half of 1985, Mobil joined Cluedo to introduce three new characters as part of its "Mobil £5 Million Cluedo Mystery" contest game: Sir Peach, Lady Oakwood, and Dr. Prussian. The characters were added along with three additional murder weapons to balance the game's playing elements. Of the three, only the name "Peach" would be re-used for other characters.Clue Chronicles: Fatal Illusion, Hasbro's short-lived interactive video-game series, added five characters to the usual six: Ian Masque, Marina Popov, Martin Urfe, Sabata, and Dr. Julia Kell. In 1938, eccentric millionaire Masque invites the original Cluedo'' suspects and the new characters to his isolated Swiss mountain estate for a mysterious dinner party. Popov is an attractive, blonde Russian psychic; Urfe is a mediocre magician hired by Masque to entertain his guests and may be a fraud; Sabata is a deranged Spanish artist; and aging German psychoanalyst Julia Kell may have Nazi ties.

References

External links
 50th-anniversary website
 List of foreign-edition character name variations
 1985 film credits
 1990–93 series credits
 1992 Australian series credits
 Clue the Musical cast list
 Clue at theartofmurder.com 
 The Changing Face of Clue's Miss Scarlett

Clue
Cluedo